The St. George Illawarra Dragons are a rugby league club jointly based in Kogarah and Wollongong, New South Wales who compete in the National Rugby League. The club was formed on 23 September 1998 by a merger of the St. George Dragons and the Illawarra Steelers and they played their first competitive match in 1999 against the Parramatta Eels, losing 20–10. The club shares home games between Jubilee Oval and Wollongong Showground.

The club has played 535 matches in the NRL, winning 271, drawing 6 and losing 258, leading to a win rate of 51.21%. In the process, they have scored 11,350 points and conceded 10,509. Their best win percentages come against the Balmain Tigers, North Sydney Bears and Western Suburbs Magpies, against whom they've never lost a game. Their worst win percentage comes against the Melbourne Storm, as the Dragons have won just 28.37% (or 10 out of 37) of their matches against the Victorian side.

Key 

 The records include matches played in the National Rugby League, both in the regular season and the finals. Trials and nines matches do not count.

  Teams with this background and symbol in the club column are competing in the 2020 NRL season alongside the Dragons
P = Games played, W = Games won, D = Games drawn, L = Games lost, F = Points scored (for), A = Points conceded (against), PD = Point differential (F-A), Win% = Win percentage

Head to head record 
Updated as of 2 May 2020

References 

St. George Illawarra Dragons
National Rugby League lists
Sydney-sport-related lists